Benjamin, Ben or Benny Hill may refer to:

People 
 Benjamin Harvey Hill (1823–1882), U.S. politician for the state of Georgia
 Benjamin J. Hill (1825–1880), Confederate States Army brigadier general during the American Civil War, merchant and lawyer
 Benjamín G. Hill (1874–1920), Mexican military commander during the Mexican Revolution
 Ben A. Hill (1892–1976), California politician
 Ben Hill Griffin Jr. (1910–1990), American businessman, citrus grower, politician and philanthropist
 Ben Hill (baseball) (born 1916), American baseball player
 Benny Hill (born Alfred Hawthorn Hill, 1924–1992), British comedian and star of The Benny Hill Show
 Benjamin Mako Hill (born 1980), American open source software developer and author
 Ben Hill (cyclist) (born 1990), Australian cyclist

Places 
 Benhill, a council housing estate in Sutton, South London
 Ben Hill County, Georgia, a county in the southern portion of the U.S. state of Georgia
 Ben Hill (Atlanta), a neighborhood in Atlanta, Georgia
 Benjamín Hill, Sonora, a Mexican municipality and municipal seat

See also 
 Ben Hills (1942–2018), Walkley Award-winning Australian freelance journalist and author
 Bennies Hill Road Bridge, steel bowstring arch bridge over Catoctin Creek near Middletown, Maryland, USA
 Hill (surname)
 

Hill, Benjamin